A list of films produced in Guatemala from the List of Latin American films:

A
Alegría de vivir, La (1959)
Alioto Vive (2003)
Ambiguity: Crónica de un Sueño Americano (2015) 
Amor en las nubes (1968)
A'plas (2009)
The Apostle (2020 film)
Aquí me quedo (2010)
Ave Fénix (1998)

B
Bienvenidos a Poptún (2006)
Bodega, La (2009)

C
Cápsulas (2011)
Caribeña (1949)
Casa de enfrente, La (2003)
Castillo de las momias de Guanajuato, El (1973)
Collect Call (2002)
Cristo negro, El (1955)
Cruces poblado próximo, Las (2006)
Cuando sea diputado (2005) 
Cuando vuelvas a mí (1953)

D
De patojo (2011)
Despedidas, Las (1998)
Detective por Error de Nito y Neto (2005)
Detrás de esa puerta (1975)
Distancia (2011)
Donde acaban los caminos (2004)
Dust (2012)

E
Estrellas de La Línea (2006) 
Evidencia invisible (2003)
Exorcismo documentado (2012)

F
Fe (2011)

G
Gasolina (2007)
Gerardi (2010)
Gitana y el charro, La (1964)
Guatemala: On the Edge of Discovery (2018)

H
Hermano Pedro, El (1967)

I
Ixcanul (2015)

L
La Llorona (2019)
Luz (2019)

M
Manzana Guena en noche Guena (2007)
Marimbas del infierno, Las (2010)
Muerte también cabalga, La (1979) 
Mujer del diablo, La (1974)
Mi mesera (1973)
Misteriosa herencia, La (2004)

N 
Norte, El (1983) (filmed in California and Mexico, about Guatemalans)

O
Ogro, El (1971)
Orígenes del silencio, Los (2005)

P
Paloma herida (1963)
Pan (2006)
Pecado (1962)
Penthouse de la muerte (1979)
Permiso a la tierra (2005)
Pesadilla mortal (1980)
Puro Mula (2011)

R
Regreso de Lencho, El (2011)
Repechaje (2009)
Retrato de familia: Videocarta (1998)
Robo de las momias de Guanajuato, El (1972) 
Rub' el kurus (Bajo la cruz) (1997)

S
Saber quién echó fuego ahí (2005)
Sangre derramada (1975)
Sangre llama, La (2007)
Satánica, La (1973)
Silencio de Neto, El (1994)
Solo de noche vienes (1966)
Sombrerón, El (1950)
Sorge du diable, Le (1991)
Ssuperzam el invencible (1971)

T
Temblores (2019)
Terremoto en Guatemala (1978)
Tierra madre (1996)
Toque de queda (2011)
Trip (2011)
Triunfo de los campeones justicieros, El (1974) 
Tuerto Angustias, El (1974)

V
Vaca, La (2011)
Ve que vivos (2006)
V.I.P. La Otra Casa (2008)
Viva la crisis (2012)
Vuelven los campeones justicieros (1972)

W
What Sebastian Dreamt (2003)

External links
 Guatemalan film at the Internet Movie Database

Guatemala

Films